Gábor Vincze (born 29 February 1976) is a former Hungarian Paralympic judoka. He is a two-time Paralympic bronze medalist, one-time World bronze medalist and two-time European medalist.

Vincze became partially blind when he was four years old after drinking a large amount of wine which caused him to have alcohol poisoning.

References

1976 births
Living people
Sportspeople from Budapest
Hungarian male judoka
Paralympic judoka of Hungary
Judoka at the 2000 Summer Paralympics
Judoka at the 2004 Summer Paralympics
Judoka at the 2008 Summer Paralympics
Medalists at the 2000 Summer Paralympics
Medalists at the 2004 Summer Paralympics
21st-century Hungarian people